The fourth series of The Great British Sewing Bee began on 16 May 2016. Claudia Winkleman returned to present alongside resident judge Patrick Grant, with May Martin being replaced by new judge Esme Young.

Sewers

Results and elimination

Colour key
 Sewer got through to the next round
 One of the judges' favourites
 One of the judges' least favourites
 Sewer was eliminated
 Sewer won Best Garment of the week
 Sewer was the series runner-up
 Sewer was the series winner

Episodes

 Sewer eliminated   Best Garment  Winner

Episode 1: Basic Construction

This episode was dedicated to series three runner-up Lorna Monje, who died of aplastic anaemia in early 2016.

Episode 2: Children's Week

Episode 3: Lingerie Week

Episode 4: International Week

Episode 5: 1960s Week

Episode 6: Active Wear Week

Episode 7: Puzzling Pattern Week

Episode 8: Evening Wear Week

Ratings

Official ratings are taken from BARB.

References

2016 British television seasons
The Great British Sewing Bee